Gustavo Kuerten was the defending champion, but retired against Magnus Norman in the second round due to fatigue.

Norman went on to win the title, defeating Tommy Haas 6–7(6–8), 4–6, 7–6(9–7), 6–0, 6–3 in the final.

Seeds
All seeds receive a bye into the second round.

Draw

Finals

Top half

Section 1

Section 2

Bottom half

Section 3

Section 4

References

 Main Draw

Stuttgart Open - Singles
Singles 1999